The 2010 New Mexico Bowl was a post-season American college football bowl game, held on December 18, 2010, at University Stadium on the campus of the University of New Mexico in Albuquerque, New Mexico. It was one of the 2010–11 NCAA football bowl games concluding the 2010 season. The organizers introduced a new logo to celebrate the 5th anniversary of the game on September 29, 2010.

The game, which was telecast at noon MST on ESPN, featured the UTEP Miners from Conference USA and the BYU Cougars from the Mountain West Conference. Both were former members of the Western Athletic Conference where the Cougars dominated the series with a 28–7–1 record. BYU, making its 29th bowl appearance, came into the game winning five out of seven games after a 1–4 start. UTEP, in just its 13th bowl, had dropped six of seven after opening the season 5–1. Both teams were making their first New Mexico Bowl appearance. UTEP was the first team from outside the WAC or MWC to play in the game due to the bowl organizers wanting a more regional matchup.

BYU won the game in dominating fashion by a score of 52–24. Freshman quarterback Jake Heaps took home MVP honors with a game-record four touchdown passes, helping his team to a 31–3 second quarter lead. UTEP extended its bowl game losing streak to five, the second-longest streak in the nation.

Game summary

Scoring summary

Statistics

Game notes

UTEP was playing in their first bowl game since 2005.
The Miners have lost five straight bowl games, tied for the second longest active streak in the nation.
UTEP hasn't won a bowl game since defeating Ole Miss in the 1967 Sun Bowl (held on their campus). 
BYU's Jake Heaps became the first freshman quarterback to start a bowl game in school history.
In the second quarter, Heaps broke Ty Detmer's 22-year-old BYU freshman record for most passing TDs in a season with 15. 
Heaps' four touchdown passes in the game set a New Mexico Bowl record.
The game was BYU's final as a member of the Mountain West Conference. They began to play as an independent starting in 2011.

References

External links
 ESPN box score

New Mexico Bowl
New Mexico Bowl
BYU Cougars football bowl games
UTEP Miners football bowl games
2010 in sports in New Mexico